"Form and Void" is the eighth episode and season finale of the first season of the American anthology crime drama television series True Detective. The episode was written by series creator Nic Pizzolatto, and directed by executive producer Cary Joji Fukunaga. It was first broadcast on HBO in the United States on March 9, 2014.

The season focuses on Louisiana State Police homicide detectives Rustin "Rust" Cohle (Matthew McConaughey) and Martin "Marty" Hart (Woody Harrelson), who investigate the murder of prostitute Dora Lange in 1995. Seventeen years later, they must revisit the investigation, along with several other unsolved crimes. In the episode, Cohle and Hart use all their resources to finally aprehend the killer, having finally located his whereabouts.

According to Nielsen Media Research, the episode was seen by an estimated 3.52 million household viewers and gained a 1.6 ratings share among adults aged 18–49, making it the most watched episode of the series. The episode received universal acclaim from critics and audiences, who praised the performances, writing, directing, cinematography, atmosphere, music, tension, pace and closure. For his performance in the episode, Matthew McConaughey received an Outstanding Lead Actor in a Drama Series nomination at the 66th Primetime Emmy Awards.

Plot

2012
The lawnmower man (Glenn Fleshler) watches over a man bound to a bed in a room filled with words in the walls, whom he calls "daddy". He exits the room to his nearby house, where he reunites with Betty (Ann Dowd), his lover. The man is later seen painting a mural at a school playground, also staring at the children. 

In the boat, Cohle (Matthew McConaughey) forces Geraci (Michael Harney) to watch the videotape depicting Marie Fontenot's rape and murder. Disturbed by the content, Geraci confesses that Sheriff Ted Childress was in charge of the investigation and then dropped the case. Cohle and Hart (Woody Harrelson) exit the boat and then leave Geraci, telling him that they have incriminating evidence against him if anything happens to them. They also inform him that they have hired a hitman to kill him if they are arrested or murdered, and prove their point by having an unseen sniper shoot at Geraci's car; the unseen sniper is in fact Robert Doumain, whose son went missing in 1985. Afterwards, Cohle and Hart leave him and drive off.

While analyzing their evidence, Hart notices that a house in Dora Lange's neighborhood was freshly painted in another picture, indicating that the killer painted it, which is why it was deemed the "green-eared spaghetti monster". As they drive to the house, they amend their confrontation regarding Maggie (Michelle Monaghan), with Cohle confessing that she visited him a few days ago just to make sure Hart was okay. They find the house and contact the original owner at the time, Lilly Hill. She remembers that people painted her house, identifying one of them as the man with the scarred face. Checking her husband's payment records, they track the company as Childress and Sons Maintenance, which worked in many areas where women and children disappeared. While family records don't reveal living sons to the founder Billy Childress, they manage to get an address to a house.

Before leaving, Cohle instructs his hitman to deliver packages with evidence to the authorities in case he doesn't return. Meanwhile, Hart meets with Papania (Tory Kittles), asking for help when needed. Despite his reservations and questioning Cohle's role, Papania accepts. Cohle and Hart then drive to the house, where phone service is not available. Hart tries to get a phone from Betty, who turns defensive and releases a dog that runs away. Hart breaks into the house while Cohle inspects the outer side. He finds the dog dead and stumbles upon the lawnmower man, Errol Childress, who flees into the woods. Back in the house, Hart eventually finds Betty and forces her to give him a phone. As he goes looking for Cohle, he enters a shed to discover the bound corpse of Errol’s father, Billy Childress.

As he follows Errol, Cohle stumbles upon a labyrinth of tunnels and is taunted by Errol to enter. Cohle ventures through the labyrinth alone, while Hart separately enters but is unable to find them both. The labyrinth mostly consists of children's clothing and latticework, a place Errol calls Carcosa. Cohle eventually reaches a room with a skeleton wearing antlers and is distracted by a vision of a vortex. Seizing this, Errol appears and stabs him in the stomach. Cohle headbutts Errol, who is then shot multiple times by an arriving Hart. Despite the shots, Errol throws a hammer at Hart, hitting him in the chest. As he prepares to kill him, Errol is shot dead in the head by Cohle. Both heavily bleeding, Hart tends to Cohle's wound. Meanwhile, Papania and Gilbough (Michael Potts) arrive with back-up at the house and start searching the area.

A few days later, Gilbough and Papania visit Hart at the hospital. They inform him that Errol and Betty were Billy Childress' children and the tools at his shed match with the weapons in Lake Charles and Dora Lange's murder, effectively closing the case. He is also informed that Cohle survived but remains in a coma after surgery. When Hart is visited by his family, he cries at the moment. Meanwhile, the media reports the discovery at Errol's house; the Tuttles avoid charges, but their reputation collapses. 

Hart is present when Cohle wakes up at his bed. Cohle is disappointed that he couldn't recognize him when he saw Errol at the school and is also frustrated that they couldn't get everyone responsible held accountable for their actions, although Hart states that their target was just Errol. Some time later, a recovered Hart checks Cohle out of the hospital and they both talk in the parking lot. He expresses that during his coma, he felt happiness knowing he would soon see his deceased daughter and father, lamenting that he survived. Hart supports him and help him stand up from his wheelchair, with both remarking on the concept of "light and darkness", with Cohle saying that while there was dark, the light appears to be winning.

Production

Development
In January 2014, the episode's title was revealed as "Form and Void" and it was announced that series creator Nic Pizzolatto had written the episode while executive producer Cary Joji Fukunaga had directed it. This was Pizzolatto's eighth writing credit, and Fukunaga's eighth directing credit.

Writing
Before the episode aired, creator Nic Pizzolatto was questioned "what should viewers be thinking about" the episode, to which he responded, "Anything they want. Binary systems, maybe."

Pizzolatto had the ending in mind when he started writing the season, indicating that Cohle would be "articulating, without sentimentality or illusion, an actual kind of optimism". He explained, "I want to follow the characters and the story through what they organically demand. And it would have been the easiest thing in the world to kill one or both of these guys." He also wanted the characters to feel a sense of redemption or deliverance, stating "They are not healed, but now, for the first time, you can imagine a future where they are healed. And before that was never a possibility for Cohle and hardly a possibility for Hart. But now it's a real earned possibility."

For the opening scene that depicts Errol Childress' house, Pizzolatto explained, "For the finale, I thought the audience deserved to get a close point of view on the monster, and to recognize him the way you recognize the heroes of True Detective. There are no monsters other than humans, no heroes other than humans. The challenge with Errol was to imply an entire history and personal mythology and methodology within the limited amount of time we had with him. Since this was the finale, I thought we could make room for one more point of view, the dark mirror to our characters, the shadow they've been chasing for so 17 years without knowing it, the historical victim of bad men who murders women and children."

Commenting on Hart's words about not arresting everyone responsible in the conspiracy, Pizzolatto said, "The significant change in the final scene is that a point of view has shifted. After we've been told via Hart that there's no such thing as absolute justice – that's a story we tell ourselves, the real guilty don't get punished. It was very hard. If someone were, I think, to read my prose, they would find it populated with rich female characters. My challenge was, if somebody only exists in relation to Cohle and Hart, so they're only going to get one or two lines, they need to become vivid and imply a history and dimensionality in one or two lines."

There was commentary about whether the skeleton in the labyrinth was truly The Yellow King. According to director Cary Joji Fukunaga, answering the question wasn't the idea behind the episode, saying "It was more of an added layer to the reasons behind the killings. Rather than the Yellow King and the books about Carcosa and the mythology around that being the centerpiece for the finale, it was just another layer."

Some alternate endings were considered for the finale. One involved a mysterious event vanishing Cohle and Hart, leaving Gilbough and Papania to clean the scene; the other concept would involve supernatural themes. Pizzolatto discarded the ideas, as it would feel "easy" and would deny "the sort of realist questions the show had been asking all along." He further added, "To retreat to the supernatural, or to take the easy dramatic route of killing a character in order to achieve an emotional response from the audience, I thought would have been a disservice to the story."

Filming

The labyrinth was shot in Fort Macomb, a 19th-century brick fort in Louisiana, on the western shore of Chef Menteur Pass. The scene was originally written to be set in a cypress forest, but complications on filming forced the crew to relocate the location. Fukunaga eventually decided on the fort, saying, "It was all chained and locked up and I like old things like that, especially Civil War things. When we got in, there were snakes everywhere and it was covered with weeds and grass. When we got to the inner chambers it was pretty awesome and really spooky and definitely had some weird energy around it." Production designer Alex DiGerlando commented, "So we were starting to prepare ourselves for a compromise to shoot it in a brushy woodland location where the only really attractive quality was that it allowed for easy access. None of us were really excited about that, though."

Reception

Viewers
The episode was watched by 3.52 million viewers, earning a 1.6 in the 18-49 rating demographics on the Nielson ratings scale. This means that 1.6 percent of all households with televisions watched the episode. This was a 50% increase from the previous episode, which was watched by 2.34 million viewers with a 1.0 in the 18-49 demographics. 

On the night of the airing, HBO Go crashed due to "overwhelmingly popular demand" of the episode.

Critical reviews

"Form and Void" received universal acclaim. Jim Vejvoda of IGN gave the episode a perfect "masterpiece" 10 out of 10 and wrote in his verdict, "The first season finale for HBO's True Detective was a truly creepy, gripping and emotional close to one of the best crime dramas ever produced for television."

Erik Adams of The A.V. Club gave the episode an "A-" grade and wrote, "On some level, everything in True Detective forms a circle; everything in True Detective is connected. You can take that as a death sentence, or you can interpret it as a brotherhood of man type of thing. For the time being, the story Rust and Marty are making up while looking at the stars is more of the latter. The light claims one more victory, all the while acknowledging that it can't hold off defeat forever." Britt Hayes of Screen Crush wrote, "For those seeking a rewarding conclusion to the first season, 'Form and Void' definitely delivers, from full-out creepiness to good ol' Rust Cohle-isms, and yes, even some deep fried detective bromance."

Alan Sepinwall of HitFix wrote, "I'll think of all the times that I was watching it, even as it was presenting variations on things I'd seen a million times before, and thinking about all the ways that the presentation and execution felt so brand-new, so haunting, so moving, and so memorable." Alan Yuhas of The Guardian wrote, "In the end, True Detective finally flipped, and Marty and Rust discovered the good life again. They became the awkward buddy comedy we'd always wanted. I just wish the evidence were a little more convincing." Ben Travers of IndieWire gave the episode an "A" grade and wrote, "'Form and Void' impossibly flipped the perspective in less than an hour. The two detectives chose to see the light instead of the dark, the truth ahead of the lies. It's not the job that defines them, though it does play an integral part. Rust and Marty learned how to define themselves, and, in the end, how to embrace life over death."

James Poniewozik of Time wrote, "Like Marty and Rust solving part, but only part, of the mystery, True Detective did what it did and didn't what it didn't, but as a whole? The light outshone the dark." Brian Lowry of Variety wrote, "Whatever comes next, there's no way to view True Detective as anything but a rousing success, with a glitch pertaining to HBO Go merely demonstrating the rabid appetite for it. Because if cop shows have become TV's answer to McDonald's, this was the equivalent of LudoBites – springing up to deliver unexpected treats for a refined, upscale palate, and poof, just as quickly moving on." 

Kenny Herzog of Vulture gave the episode a perfect 5 star rating out of 5 and wrote, "There was, as has been the case throughout, more than a little humor and cliché in 'Form and Void', from Rust and Marty's dueling middle fingers to Errol and Mrs. Errol's overall bayou-bogey-folk eccentricity. Odds are those playful details will pop on second viewings, despite the show's prevailing seriousness. Even Rust looks skyward and reminds himself and Marty that, 'Once there was always dark. If you ask me, the light's winning.' And True Detective, in turn, illuminated a black-and-white crime-and-coppers story with winning oddness to its end." Tony Sokol of Den of Geek gave the episode a perfect 5 star rating out of 5 and wrote, "True Detectives final episode, 'Form and Void', breaks the cardinal rule of show business. Leave 'em wanting more. Oh sure, I'd love to watch this every week for the rest of my life, but this was satisfying. True Detective satisfied me as a supernatural suspense thriller, as a monster movie and as a worthy entry into the Satanic Detective genre. And it was a good cop show, with grit and humor, that could sit atop any list with Joseph Wambaugh in it." 

Chris O'Hara of TV Fanatic gave the episode a perfect 5 star rating out of 5 and wrote, "What we got in 'Form and Void' was a fitting conclusion to one of the best seasons of television I have seen in years. It was a finale packed with all the elements of the show which have made it so compelling to watch." Shane Ryan of Paste gave the episode a perfect 10 out of 10 and wrote, "When we refer to True Detective from this moment on, it will be in the past tense, and that realization comes with a weight of sadness. But the phenomenon of its existence can't be restricted to two months of Sundays. There's a permanence in the connection it fostered, and the questions, so remarkably asked, will resonate hereafter."

Accolades
Matthew McConaughey submitted the episode to support his nomination for Outstanding Lead Actor in a Drama Series at the 66th Primetime Emmy Awards.

Notes

References

External links
 "Form and Void" at HBO
 

2014 American television episodes
True Detective episodes
Television episodes written by Nic Pizzolatto